This is a list of breweries in the English county of Berkshire.  The list includes both operational and defunct breweries, as well as microbreweries.

Caveats
Some breweries, such as the Morland Brewery in Abingdon, were in Berkshire until border changes in the 1970s. As such, these breweries are not included in this list.  Similarly, some breweries (such as the Courage Brewery) have, at times, brewed beer in Berkshire.  As these breweries were not based solely or primarily in the county, they are not included in this list.

List of breweries

See also
 Beer in England
 List of breweries in England

References

Breweries
Berkshire
English cuisine-related lists
Companies based in Berkshire